Jeff Farrington is a former American politician. Farrington is former a Republican member of the Michigan House of Representatives. Farrington is the COO at Gordon Advisors.

Early life 
Farrington's parents are Tom and Marie Farrington. Farrington grew up in Utica, Michigan. In 1983, Farrington graduated from Utica High School.

Education 
Farrington attended Macomb Community College. In 1988, Farrington earned a  bachelor's degree in Business Administration from Walsh College. In 1993, Farrington earned a master's degree in Management from Walsh College.

Career 
In 1993, Farrington was the Vice President of Kforce, a staffing company, until 2004. In 2004, Farrington co-founded and became President of Dynamic Recruiters, Inc until 2011.

In November 2010, Farrington was elected as a member of Michigan House of Representatives in Michigan's 30th House of Representatives district.

In 2012 he was reelected from a new district which included more of Sterling Heights than had his old district.

Since 2012, Farrington is the President of Echo Consultants LLC.

In 2016, due to term limits, Farrington will not be able to run for another term.

In 2017, Farrington became the COO for Gordon Advisors, a CPA and consulting firm.

Awards 
 2012 Legislator of the year. Present by Michigan Manufacturers Association.
 2014 Legislator of the Year. Presented by Fraternal Order of Police.

Personal life 
Farrington's wife is Diana Farrington, a politician in Michigan. They have two children, Mitch and Nick.

See also 
 2010 Michigan House of Representatives election
 2012 Michigan House of Representatives election
 2014 Michigan House of Representatives election

References

External links 
 Farrington Audio at gophouse.org
 Jeff Farrington at ballotpedia.org
Farrington campaign bio
Shelby-Utica Patch article on Farrington winning the primary in 2012

Living people
Macomb Community College alumni
People from Utica, Michigan
Walsh College alumni
Republican Party members of the Michigan House of Representatives
21st-century American politicians
Year of birth missing (living people)